Feehan is an Irish surname.

Feehan may also refer to:

 Bishop Feehan High School, Attleboro, Massachusetts
 E. D. Feehan Catholic High School, Saskatoon, Saskatchewan
 Feehan Triangle, a public green space in Queens, New York
 William M. Feehan (fireboat), operated by the New York City Fire Department